Čemaluša mosque (Bosnian: Čemaluševa džamija / Turkish: Cemaluşa camii) also known as Havadža Kemaludin mosque was a mosque located between the Ferhadija street and the Maršala Tito street and was located at the corner of the street with the same name, Čemaluša. The modern day residential and business building also named after Havadža Kemaludin (simply known as JAT building) stands there.

History 
Čemaluša mosque was designed and built in 1515 by Havadža Kemaludin who was a student at that time. The mosque had a stone minaret located on the left, a roof on four waters, covered with shingles. The arched windows were framed with plaster and stained glass. The wide ceiling above the mihrab with stalactites was filled with tiny pieces of multicolored carved wood. Ablution was performed on two fountains - male and female water.

Next to the mosque was a large cemetery, surrounded by a wall, which dates back to the time of the Ottoman conquest of Bosnia. Members of the Hadžimusić, Novo and Dženetić families were buried in the harem of Čemaluša. War veteran Mustaj-beg Dženetić, who died in 1874, bequeathed a hundred ducats to the waqf in his will with an explicit order to bury him between the two oldest martyrs' tombstones.

Following the arrival of Austro-Hungarians, the Čemaluša street began to abruptly rise with traditional Bosnian houses being replaced with buildings which spanned through Ferhadija.

Čemaluša mosque was demolished in 1940 by the government of the Kingdom of Yugoslavia who ordered the demolition in June 1939. Reuf Kadić later designed and built the modern day JAT building in 1947.

Literature 

 Emir Kadić - Reuf Kadić and the beginnings of modern architecture in Bosnia and Herzegovina. Sarajevo, 2010
 Živorad Janković - Muhamed Kadić - life and work, Academy of Sciences and Arts of BiH, Sarajevo.
 Alija Bejtić - Streets and squares of Sarajevo.
 Nedžad Kurto - Sarajevo 1492–1992, Oko, Sarajevo.
 Predrag Milošević - Architecture in the Kingdom of Yugoslavia (Sarajevo 1918–1941). Foča: Prosvjeta, 1997

References 

Destroyed mosques
Demolished buildings and structures in Bosnia and Herzegovina
Buildings and structures demolished in 1940
Mosques in Sarajevo
Ottoman mosques in Bosnia and Herzegovina
Mosques completed in the 1510s
Sunni mosques